Stepping Out: The Very Best of Joe Jackson is a compilation album from the English musician Joe Jackson. The songs, arranged in chronological order, are taken from nine of his first twelve albums, all of which were released on the A&M Records label. Stepping Out: The Very Best of Joe Jackson reached No. 7 in the UK Albums Chart in October 1990. By this time Jackson had parted company with A&M, with his next few releases being on the Virgin Records label.

In his book, The Great Rock Discography, music historian Martin C. Strong awards the album 8 out of 10.

Track listing 

The LP release did not include the songs "Beat Crazy" and "Home Town". The Australian LP/CD/tape release omitted "Fools in Love" and inserted "Real Men" in its place, as that had been a #6 hit in Australia in 1982.

Production and songwriting credits
Based on the track numbering from the CD version of the album, the songs were produced by: tracks 1, 2, 3 and 4 by David Kershenbaum; tracks 7, 8, 9, 10, 11, 12 and 13 by Joe Jackson and David Kershenbaum; tracks 5, 6, 14 and 15 by Joe Jackson.

All tracks were written by Joe Jackson, except for "Jumpin' Jive", penned in 1939 by Cab Calloway, Frank Froeba and Jack Palmer.

Photography by Janette Beckman.

Charts

References

External links 
 Stepping Out album information at The Joe Jackson Archive

1990 greatest hits albums
Joe Jackson (musician) albums
A&M Records compilation albums
Albums produced by David Kershenbaum